"Hold Out" is a song performed by English musician Sam Fender. The song was released as a digital download on 13 February 2020 by Polydor Records. The song was written by Sam Fender and produced by Bramwell Bronte.

Background
Fender originally wrote the song when he was twenty. Talking about the song, he said: "It's about going out on the lash back home which was really just a form of escape." Fender explained that the lyrics address issues facing young people and partying and alcohol.

Music video
A music video to accompany "Hold Out" was first released on YouTube on 13 February 2020. The music video was directed by Jack Whitefield.

Personnel
Credits adapted from Tidal.
 Bramwell Bronte – producer, associated performer, engineer, programming, studio personnel
 Sam Fender – composer, lyricist, associated performer, bass, guitar, vocals
 Drew Michael – associated performer, drums
 Johnny 'Blue Hat' Davis – associated performer, saxophone
 Joseph Atkinson – associated performer, synthesizer
 Dean Thompson – engineer, studio personnel
 Rich Costey – mixer, studio personnel

Charts

Release history

References

2020 songs
Sam Fender songs
Polydor Records singles